Nir Am (lit. Nation Meadow) is a kibbutz in southern Israel. Located near Sderot and covering 20,000 dunams, it falls under the jurisdiction of Sha'ar HaNegev Regional Council.

History
The village was established on 19 August 1943 by immigrants from Bessarabia who were members of the Gordonia youth movement, including Zvi Guershoni, later a member of the Knesset. Over the years the kibbutz has also absorbed immigrants from Argentina, France and South Africa.
During the 1948 war it was the headquarters of the Negev Brigade. In a report written in March 1948 by Yaakov Riftin investigating abuses in Haganah and Palmach units, it emerged that an Arab was seized, tortured and killed.

Economy, culture and landmarks

An innovative work area was created in Kibbutz Nir Am (Incubator), Offices and workplaces for rent to start-ups, small companies in high-tech activities).

The "Museum of Water and Security in the Negev" is located at Nir Am, next to Mekorot's Nir Am Reservoir.

The Assaf Siboni Scenic Lookout and memorial, at a vantage point near the Nir Am Reservoir, offers excellent views of the Gaza Strip and especially of Jabalia.

Notable people

 Zvi Guershoni (co-founder, 1943)
 Baruch Kamin (1914–1988), Israeli politician, member of the Knesset for Mapai (1953–55)
 Adam Neumann (born 1979), Israeli-American businessman, co-founder of WeWork

References

External links
Kibbutz website 
Nir Am Negev Information Centre
SouthUp innovation-center for the Gaza envelope and Israel's "periphery" (disadvantaged regions, mostly near the borders); offices in Sha'ar Hanegev and Nir Am
Wikimedia photos from the Museum of Water and Security in the Negev

Argentine-Jewish culture in Israel
Kibbutzim
Kibbutz Movement
Populated places established in 1943
Gaza envelope
Populated places in Southern District (Israel)
1943 establishments in Mandatory Palestine
French-Jewish culture in Israel
Romanian-Jewish culture in Israel
South African-Jewish culture in Israel